The Fritz London Memorial Prize was created to recognize scientists who made outstanding contributions to the advances of the field of Low Temperature Physics. It is traditionally awarded in the first session of the International Conference on Low Temperature Physics, which is sponsored by the International Union of Pure and Applied Physics. The prize is named in honor of Fritz London.

Winners 
Source:Duke University

 1957 Nicholas Kurti
 1960 Lev D. Landau
 1962 John Bardeen
 1964 David Shoenberg
 1966 Cornelis J. Gorter
 1968 William M. Fairbank
 1970 Brian Josephson
 1972 Alexei Abrikosov
 1975 John Wheatley
 1978 Guenter Ahlers, William L. McMillan, John M. Rowell
 1981 John Reppy, Anthony J. Leggett, Isidor Rudnick
 1984 Werner Buckel, Olli Lounasmaa, David J. Thouless
 1987 K. Alex Müller, Johannes Georg Bednorz, Jun Kondo, John Clarke
 1990 Robert C. Dynes, Pierre C. Hohenberg, Anatoly Larkin
 1993 Albert Schmid, Dennis Greywall, Horst Meyer
 1996 Moses H. W. Chan, Carl Wieman, Eric A. Cornell
 1999 Douglas F. Brewer, Matti Krusius, Wolfgang Ketterle
 2002 Russell J. Donnelly, Walter N. Hardy, Allen M. Goldman
 2005 Sébastien Balibar, J.C. Séamus Davis, Richard Packard
 2008 Yuriy M. Bunkov, Vladimir V. Dmitriev, Igor A. Fomin
 2011 Humphrey Maris, Hans Mooij, Gerd Schön
 2014 Michel Devoret, John M. Martinis, Robert J. Schoelkopf
 2017 William Halperin, Jeevak Parpia, James Sauls
 2020 Frank Steglich, Valerii Vinokour, Qi-Kun Xue

See also

 List of physics awards

References 

Physics awards
Awards established in 1957
American science and technology awards